The  was a political and military dispute that took place in Japan during the Asuka period between the pro-Shinto Mononobe clan, led by Mononobe no Moriya, and the pro-Buddhist Soga clan, led by Soga no Umako, which would eventually emerge victorious.

Background

The Soga clan had risen to prominence under Emperor Kinmei, with Soga no Iname becoming the first Soga to hold the title (kabane) of ōomi at the imperial court. Iname married two of his daughters to Kinmei, but died before the selection of Kinmei's non-Soga son Emperor Bidatsu as the imperial successor. Bidatsu's first empress was not a member of the Soga clan, but his second empress (the future Empress Suiko) was. Bidatsu's death led to a succession dispute among supporters of Prince Oshisaka (the son of Bidatsu by his first wife), Prince Takeda (son of Bidatsu by his second wife), and Bidatsu's half-brother Prince Anahobe (son of Kinmei by Soga no Kitashihime). Prince Oshisaka had apparently been named crown prince by Emperor Bidatsu and had the support of the Mononobe clan, while the Soga clan under Soga no Umako supported the claim of Prince Anahobe. The succession struggle turned violent after Ōomi Soga no Umako and Ōmuraji Motonobe no Moriya exchanged insults at the temporary interment ceremony for Emperor Bidatsu. The Soga clan was victorious and Prince Anahobe was enthroned as Emperor Yomei.

Soga no Umako continued to serve as ōomi under Emperor Yomei, and Yomei's wife was another member of the Soga clan who gave birth to four sons, including Prince Shōtoku. The Soga–Mononobe conflict resurfaced during the succession crisis following Yomei's death, with the Soga once again victorious at the Battle of Mount Shigi, solidifying the clan's influential position at the imperial court.

Battle at Mount Shigi
Takeshi Umehara notes that some ancient and medieval accounts say that the decisive battle took place in July of 587 near Mount Shigi.

Between July 1 and 2 the Soga are said to have been defeated in a series of engagements with the Mononobe, who, according to the Nihon Shoki, employed a type of fortification called an inaki, a palisade constructed from bundles of rice plants.

The Soga gradually retreated westward and by July 3 the demoralized Soga troops had finally concentrated in the area between Mount Shigi and Mount Ikoma. Legend has it that at this point Prince Shōtoku of the Soga cut down a sacred nuride tree, fashioned it into an image of the Four Heavenly Kings of Buddhism, and placed it on his forehead. Shōtoku and Soga no Umako then both openly vowed to build a temple to the Four Heavenly Kings should they be victorious in the battle, which reenergized their men prior to the final confrontation. In this final battle the turning point came when a Soga archer, named by the Nihon Shoki as one Tomi no Obito Ichii, fired the arrow which killed Mononobe clan leader Mononobe no Moriya, after which his forces were quickly routed.

The main line of the Mononobe family, the most powerful opponent of Buddhism, was, together with its retainers killed in the battle. The survivors were dispersed, and some adopted a different name.

Shōtoku has traditionally been credited with the founding of two temples which he is said to have had constructed following the battle: Shitennoji and Shigisan Temple.

Notes
The name of Mount Shigi where the battle took place has been written as both Shigisan and Shigisen and for this reason the battle has been referred to as the Battle of Shigisan or Battle of Shigisen.

References

Battles involving Japan
Asuka period
580s conflicts
550s
560s
570s
580s
6th century in Japan
Buddhism and violence
Japanese imperial history